"Still Want You" is the second single by American singer-songwriter Brandon Flowers from his second studio album, The Desired Effect.

Composition
The song reflects on seemingly negative trends in the world (aging, rising crime, climate change, nuclear distress, global disasters) and rebuffs them with the line "I Still Want You". It is ostensibly about staying together.

Music video
In promotion of the video, Flowers's YouTube channel released a series of clips titled "Keys", "Bass", "Drums", "Vox", and "Strings".

The black and white music video was directed by Warren Fu (Daft Punk, The Killers, Haim). The video portrays Flowers and two backup singers in black and white dancing and singing.

Reception

Critical
Billboard gave the song a positive review remarking that, "[t]his song is awesome . . . When the call and return chorus of Flowers' hook is answered by the high-pitched choral voices, "Still Want You" kicks into another gleeful gear."  Stereogum called it a continuance of "the creative renaissance that the Killers frontman seems to be going through with his new solo album, The Desired Effect."  Gigwise said of the track, "Flowers delivers on his promise to give us something a bit different, yet it remains just as great as his previous offerings have been." DirectLyrics wrote, "The first single was amazing but this new song is just ‘instant’, quite catchy at moments, and evidently a whole more radio-friendly than its predecessor."

Track listing

Accolades

References

2015 songs
2015 singles
Brandon Flowers songs
Songs written by Brandon Flowers
Island Records singles
Song recordings produced by Ariel Rechtshaid
Music videos directed by Warren Fu